Lilford-cum-Wigsthorpe and Thorpe Achurch are a pair of adjacent civil parishes in the English county of Northamptonshire that share a single parish council.

Forming part of the district of North Northamptonshire (formerly East Northamptonshire) its main settlements are Achurch, Thorpe Waterville and Wigsthorpe. The parish includes Lilford Hall.

External links
Contact details for the parish council

Local government in Northamptonshire
North Northamptonshire